The 2020–21 Dayton Flyers men's basketball team represented the University of Dayton in the 2020–21 NCAA Division I men's basketball season. Their head coach was Anthony Grant, in his fourth season with the Flyers. The Flyers played their home games at UD Arena in Dayton, Ohio as members of the Atlantic 10 Conference. They finished the season  14-10, 9-7 to finish in 7th place. They defeated Rhode Island in the second round in the A10 Tournament before losing to VCU in the quarterfinals. They were invited to the NIT where they lost in the first round to Memphis.

Previous season
The Flyers finished the season with an overall record of 29–2 and were undefeated regular season champions of the Atlantic 10. Grant was named consensus national coach of the year while sophomore Obi Toppin became Dayton's first consensus first-team All-American and earned the majority of major college player of the year awards, including the Naismith College Player of the Year and the John R. Wooden Award. The season was cut short due to the COVID-19 pandemic prior to the Flyers’ first game of the Atlantic 10 tournament. They finished ranked third in both major polls, their highest ranking in a major media poll since the Don Donoher era.

Offseason

Departures

Incoming transfers

2020 recruiting class

2021 recruiting class

Roster

Schedule and results

Dayton had to cancel its games against Cedarville, Alcorn State, and Purdue Fort Wayne due to the COVID-19 pandemic. They also postponed their game against George Washington.

|-
!colspan=12 style=| Exhibition

|-
!colspan=12 style=| Regular season

|-
!colspan=12 style=| A-10 tournament

|-
!colspan=12 style=| NIT

Source:

Rankings

References

Dayton Flyers men's basketball seasons
Dayton
Dayton
2020 in sports in Ohio
2021 in sports in Ohio